The Szeged Synagogue is a synagogue in Szeged, Hungary. It is a 1902 building designed by the Jewish Hungarian architect Lipót Baumhorn (1860–1932), whose work is considered to contain the finest examples of the unique fin de siècle Hungarian blending of Art Nouveau and Historicist styles sometimes known as Magyar style. It served Szeged's large Neolog community.

The rib-like wall above the organ has Gothic origins, while the columns supporting the galleries are Roman.

The interior of the great dome, and all of the building's stained glass, are the work of the artist Miksa Róth.

The design of the Torah Ark alludes to the Holy of Holies in the Temple of Solomon by using sittimwood from the banks of Nile, the wood called for in the building of the Temple of Solomon in 1 Kings. The hinges are in the shape of the Hyssop plant, a plant used in the ancient Temple service.

The Szeged Synagogue is the second largest in Hungary after the Dohány Street Synagogue in Budapest, and the 4th largest in the world.

References

External links
 Szeged Synagogue Website
 Leopold Baumhorn on Jewish.hu's list of famous Hungarian Jews

Synagogues in Hungary
Neolog Judaism synagogues
Judaism in Hungary
Art Nouveau synagogues
Buildings and structures in Szeged
Tourist attractions in Csongrád-Csanád County
Art Nouveau architecture in Hungary
Synagogues completed in 1902
Synagogue buildings with domes